{{Infobox organization
| name                = Islamic Community of Montenegro
| native_name         = Islamska Zajednica Crne Gore(Montenegrin and Bosnian)Bashkësia Islame në Malin e Zi (Albanian)
| image               = 
| formation           = 
| founder             = 
| type                = Religious organization
| headquarters        = Podgorica, Montenegro
| location            = 
| coordinates         = 
| language            = Montenegrin, Bosnian & Albanian
| leader_title        = Reis
| leader_name         = Rifat Fejzić
| key_people          = 
| website             = 
| extinction          = 
| size                = 300px
| general             = 
| slogan              = 
}}
The Islamic Community of Montenegro (Montenegrin and Bosnian: Islamska Zajednica u Crnoj Gori or IZCG) is an independent religious organization of Muslims in Montenegro, established as Muftiate of Montenegro in 1878. The headquarter of the community is in Podgorica and the current leader, titled Reis'', is Rifat Fejzić.

History 

Montenegro, under Nicholas I, expanded its territories after the Montenegrin–Ottoman War of 1876–1878 and was internationally recognized in 1878 by the Treaty of Berlin as an independent nation. The newly acquired lands had a large Muslim population, and the provisions of Treaty of Berlin guaranteed Muslims in Montenegro the freedom of religion and the right of religious endowment (waqf) property. In 1878, with the approval of Shaykh al-Islām, the first Mufti of Montenegro Salih Efendi Huli was chosen.

Structure 
Islamic Community is divided into 13 Councils of Islamic Community: Podgorica, Tuzi, Dinoša, Bar, Ostros, Ulcinj, Pljevlja, Bijelo Polje, Berane, Petnjica, Rožaje, Plav, and Gusinje.

See also 
Islam in Montenegro

References

Islam in Montenegro